Anastasiia Ruslanivna Yalova (born 4 March 1995) is a former Ukrainian figure skater. She  represented Ukraine at the 2013 Winter Universiade and 2015 Winter Universiade.

Competitive highlights 
JGP: Junior Grand Prix''

References

External links 
 

1995 births
Ukrainian female single skaters
Living people
Sportspeople from Dnipro
Competitors at the 2015 Winter Universiade
Competitors at the 2013 Winter Universiade